Ilieon Kome was a town in ancient Troad, on Kallikolone mountain (modern Karatepe).

Its site is located on Karatepe, Asiatic Turkey.

References

Populated places in ancient Troad
Former populated places in Turkey